The Estimates Committee (India) is a committee of selected members of parliament, constituted by the Parliament of India (the Lok Sabha), for the purpose of scrutinising the functioning of government ministries and departments in terms of expenditure and utilisation of funds. It also suggests alternative policies in order to bring about efficiency and economy in administration. It also examines whether the finances are laid out within the limits of the policy implied in the estimates and also to suggest the form in which the estimates shall be presented to Parliament. This committee along with the Public Accounts committee(PAC) and Committee on Public Undertakings (COPU) are the three financial standing committees of the Parliament of India.

The committee consists of thirty members, all elected from Lok Sabha, the lower house of the Parliament of India. The members are elected every year from amongst its members of the Lok Sabha, according to the principle of proportional representation by means of single transferable vote. The chairperson is appointed by the Lok Sabha speaker. The term of office of the members is one year. A minister is not eligible to become a member of the committee or continue to serve after appointment as a minister. There are no members from Rajya Sabha

Currently the committee is headed by Girish Bapat from the Bharatiya Janata Party.

History 
Although the committee existed pre-independence, post independence, it was established following directives by John Mathai. In his speech presenting the budget of 1950–51, Mathai outlined the role that had been envisaged, saying

Initially the membership of the committee was limited to 25 members, however, in 1956, the membership was expanded to 30 members.

Scope and working 
The functions of the committee as enshrined in Rule 310 of Rules of Procedure and Conduct of Business in Lok Sabha are:

 To report what economies, improvements in organisation, efficiency or administrative reform, consistent with the policy underlying the estimates may be effected 
 To suggest alternative policies in order to bring about efficiency and economy in administration 
 To examine whether the money is well laid out within the limits of the policy implied in the estimates 
 To suggest the form in which the estimates shall be presented to Parliament.

The committee from time to time selects the estimates pertaining to a ministry or department of the central government or such of the statutory and other bodies of the central government as may seem fit to the committee. The committee also examines matters of special interest which may arise in the course of its work or which are specially referred to it by the house or by the speaker. The committee calls for preliminary materials from the relevant bodies in regard to the subjects selected for examination and also comments from non-officials connected with the subjects for the use of the members of the committee.

The committee does not exercise its functions in relation to such public sector undertakings as are allotted to the Committee on Public Undertakings by the Rules of Procedure and Conduct of Business of Lok Sabha or by the speaker.

Current composition 
Keys:             = 30 members

Sub-committees 
Currently there are two sub-committees within the estimates committee. They are as follows:

Current subjects of examination 
By the press release circulated on 17 May 2018, the committee released the subjects that it has selected for examination during the year 2018-19

Probes in recent years

Ganga rejuvenation (2016) 
The committee noted in its May 2016 report that the river Ganga has been declared one of the ten most polluted rivers of the world. The committee outlined the gist of numerous recommendations as

In view of the incalculable damage caused to the "Nirmalta" and "Aviralta" of the river due to continued emptying of untreated sewage and industrial pollutants into the Ganga despite the efforts made under Ganga Action Plan –I&II; excessive use of chemical fertilizers in the Ganga basin leading to disposal of high levels of nitrogen and phosphorus which eventually drains into surface and subsurface water which is part of the Ganga river system and the multiplicity of authorities wanting in synergy, the Committee recommend that an overarching and empowered authority be set up for securing the 'nirmalta' and 'aviralta' and rejuvenation of the Ganga without further delay.

Indian activist G. D. Agrawal passed away at the age of 86, following a 15-week hunger strike aimed at protesting the state of the Ganges river. He was a former professor of environmental engineering at IIT Kanpur.

Banking sector NPAs (2018) 

As of December 2017, this toxic debt problem worsened as it touched  with public sector banks(PSBs) accounting for over 86% of the pie roughly  In September 2018, the Joshi led committee sent notices to the coal and power ministries asking for explanations on mounting NPAs in the sectors.

GDP norms issue (2018) 
The committee noted in its report titled "Measuring growth, employment and income" that there are several parameters that need to be factored into the calculation of the GDP, like indicators to gauge the environmental resource decay and replenishment efforts made to compensate the loss concluding that - " The committee strongly recommends the government to have mechanisms by coming up with new measures of GDP estimation and statistical measurement of other socio-economic factors "

Chairpersons

Chairpersons of the committee (1950–present)

Longest serving chairpersons of committee on estimates

Reports published 
As part of its oversight process the committee has published quite a number of reports over the course of its existence. The committee has published a total of 1118 reports from 1950 to 2018. Out of these, 624 are the original reports and 494 are reports on action taken by the government on corresponding reports of the committee.

See also 

 17th Lok Sabha
 Committee on Public Undertakings
 Public Accounts Committee (India)
 Standing Committee on Defence (India)
 Standing Committee on Finance
 List of Indian parliamentary committees

References

External links 
 Rules of Procedure and Conduct of Business in Lok Sabha 2014
 Lok Sabha - Estimates committee homepage
 Selected subjects for examination during 2018–19
 Press release - Ganga Rejuvenation report 2016

1950 establishments in India
Committees of the Parliament of India